Amalia Abad Casasempere (11 December 1897 – 21 September 1936) was a Catholic woman killed in Alcoy, Spain, during the Spanish Civil War. She was born in Alcoy and was a widow and mother of two daughters, and she was very active in the service of the church. She hid two nuns in her house at the outbreak of the civil war. For this she was arrested and executed by the militia. She was one of 233 people beatified by Pope John Paul II on 11 March 2001, as martyrs of the Spanish Civil War (the name given by the Catholic Church to those killed by Republicans because of their faith).

References

Bibliography 
 Vicent Gabarda Cebellán. 1996. The repression in the Republican rearguard: Valencian region, 1936-1939. Vol. 18 of Arxius i documents. Published by Edicions Alfons el Magnànim, Institució Valencian d'Estudis i Investigació, 374 pp.

External links 
 Her biography (in Spanish)
 Author biography (in Spanish)
 Religion In Libertad article (in Spanish)

People from Alicante
Spanish beatified people
People executed by firing squad
Women in the Spanish Civil War
1897 births
1936 deaths
Martyrs of the Spanish Civil War